The 2017–18 South Carolina Gamecocks women's basketball team represented the University of South Carolina during the 2017–18 NCAA Division I women's basketball season. The Gamecocks, led by tenth year head coach Dawn Staley, played their home games at the Colonial Life Arena and were members of the Southeastern Conference. They finished the season 29–7, 12–4 in SEC play to finish in a tie for second place. They defeated Tennessee, Georgia and Mississippi State to win the SEC women's tournament to earn an automatic bid to the NCAA women's tournament. They defeated North Carolina A&T and Virginia in the first and second rounds, Buffalo in the sweet sixteen before losing to Connecticut in the elite eight.

Previous season
South Carolina finished the season 33-4 (14-2), winning the SEC Regular season, SEC Tournament Championship, and the NCAA National Championship. Heading into the NCAA tournament South Carolina was the #1 seed in the Stockton regional, where they defeated UNC Asheville, Arizona State, Quinnipiac, and Florida State, to win the Stockton region and get to the Final Four. In the Final Four, South Carolina defeated Stanford 62–53 to advance to the Championship game. On April 2, 2017, South Carolina defeated Mississippi State to win their first National Championship. A'ja Wilson won the NCAA basketball tournament Most Outstanding Player award.

Offseason

Departures

Incoming transfers

Recruits

Roster

Schedule

|-
!colspan=9 style="background:#73000A; color:#FFFFFF;" | Exhibition

|-
!colspan=9 style="background:#73000A; color:#FFFFFF;"| Regular season

|-
!colspan=9 style="background:#73000A; color:#FFFFFF;" | SEC Women's Tournament

|-
!colspan=9 style="background:#73000A; color:#FFFFFF;" | NCAA Women's Tournament

Rankings

^Coaches' Poll did not release a second poll at the same time as the AP.

Team players drafted into the WNBA

References

South Carolina Gamecocks women's basketball seasons
Gamecocks
South Carolina
Gamecocks
South Carolina